This is a list of notable people of Russian Azerbaijani descent.

References 

Azerbaijani
Russian
Azerbaijani